Who Laughs Last is a 1954 Soviet Belarusian comedy film directed by Vladimir Korsh-Sablin.

Plot 
The film tells about the scientist Tulyaga, telling his colleagues the story of how one person on the street thought that Tulyaga walking by is the White Guard Podgaetski himself, as a result of which Tulyaga was frightened and asked the passer-by to keep silent about it. But, as it turned out, they were eavesdropped by the gossip Zelkin, who later passed this information on to the director of the institute, or, to be more exact, ignorant, by the blame that got this post, to Gorlokhvatsky. Zelkin also spreads rumors that the new work of Chernous, who abused Zelkin, received negative reviews. The director decides to use the situation for personal purposes. But, as we all know well, he laughs best who laughs last.

Starring 
 Leonid Rakhlenko as Aleksandr Petrovich Gorlokhvatskiy
 Lidiya Shinko as Anna Pavlovna Gorlokhvatskaya
 Gleb Glebov as Nikita Semyonovich Tulyaga
 Vladimir Vladomirskiy as Aleksandr Petrovich Chernous
 Liliya Stepanovna Drozdova as Vera Mikhaylovna
 Ivan Shatillo as Mikhail Pavlovich Levanovich
 Boris Platonov as Zyolkin
 Zinaida Brovarskaya as Zina Zyolkina
 Lidiya Rzhetskaya as Katya
 Genrikh Grigonis as Nikifor
 Pavel Molchanov as Nikolay Vasilyevich Anikeyev

References

External links 
 

1954 films
1950s Russian-language films
Soviet comedy films
1954 comedy films